The history of boxing in Japan began in 1854 when Matthew Perry landed at Shimoda, Shizuoka soon after the Convention of Kanagawa.  At that time, American sailors often engaged in sparring matches on board their ships, with their fists wrapped in thin leather.  It was the first example of boxing conveyed to Japan. In addition, an ōzeki-ranked sumo wrestler named  was summoned by the shogunate, and ordered to fight a boxer and a wrestler from the United States.  There were three fought matches, using different martial arts' styles, before Perry and other spectators.  Koyanagi reportedly won.

History
The first exhibition match named  was held in Tsukiji, Tokyo in 1887.

After learning boxing in San Francisco, California since 1906,  established  in Shimomeguro, Meguro, Tokyo, on December 25, 1921.  from Rikkyo University began boxing under Watanabe's management.

In the first Japanese title matches for professional boxers held in April 1924, Fuji Okamoto in the flyweight division and Kintarō Usuda in the lightweight division became titleholders. There was no clear distinction between amateur and professional around that time.

Inauguration of Federation
Fuji Okamoto in the bantamweight division and Kintarō Usuda in the welterweight division participated in the 1928 Summer Olympics.

 founded in February 1931 in order to perform the establishment of championships and the development of professional boxers, repeated division and dissolution to become the current Japan Pro Boxing Association (JPBA).  from Waseda University gained popularity and played an active part in those days. Although Japan's boxing was interrupted by the Pacific War, the first Japanese championships after the war was held in 1947.

World title match
Then the Japan Boxing Commission (JBC), virtually the only governing body of Japan's professional boxing, was founded in order to prepare Yoshio Shirai's world title match. Its establishment was presented at the Tokyo Kaikan on April 21, 1952.  from Waseda University who was the founding president of Teiken Boxing Gym and the president of the Korakuen Stadium, was elected as its first commissioner.

Shirai defeated lineal champion Dado Marino via a unanimous decision in the flyweight division on May 19 of that year, while being watched by 45,000 spectators at the Korakuen Stadium, to become the Japan's first world champion.

WBA and WBC
The JBC has joined the NBA (the current WBA) as of January 7, 1954. They have also joined the WBC since the rematch of Johnny Famechon vs. Fighting Harada in May 9, 1970.

Boxing Magazine

In June 1956, Boxing Magazine, the Japan's oldest surviving boxing journal, was launched by the Baseball Magazine Company. Currently there is only one other monthly boxing journal in Japan, called Boxing Beat. This has been renamed twice from World Boxing since 1968.

Pro-Am joint training

Traditionally, the different bodies of amateur and professional boxers had had no exchanges. However they decided in 2011 to cooperate with each other, beginning with joint training.

From 2011 through 2012, the middleweight boxers had record-breaking performances both in amateur and professional boxing. Nobuhiro Ishida knocked out the previously undefeated James Kirkland at the MGM Grand Las Vegas to be awarded The Ring Upset of the Year. Ryōta Murata secured the silver medal in the World Amateur Boxing Championships in Baku, Azerbaijan to qualify for the 2012 Summer Olympics. Tadashi Yuba won his fifth Japanese title in four different weight divisions to be a quadruple champion. All those are the first records for Japan. In August 2013, Yuba picked up the Japanese super welterweight title to be a quintuple champion.

Television
Most of the world championship fights have been televised mainly on Nittere (NTV), TBS, Fuji TV, and TV Tokyo. Currently, these programs can be legally watched outside Japan via KeyHoleTV. In addition, pay-TV channels such as WOWOW and sky-A sports+ have provided boxing programs. Although Fuji TV had been withdrawn from boxing except for the late-night show since Yūji Watanabe lost to Genaro Hernández in 1992, they resumed a live boxing program in prime time from April 2013.

Amateur boxing

Summer Olympics
The Summer Olympics medalists are:

World Championships
The World Championships medalists are:

Professional boxing

In Japan, every professional boxer must contract with a manager under the JBC rules, and is required to belong to a boxing gym which has exclusive management rights for boxers as a member of each regional subsidiary body of Japan Pro Boxing Association under the Japan's conventional gym system. Two professional boxers belonging to the same gym have not been allowed to fight against each other unless one of them transfers to other gym, because it might disrupt the gym system. However, it is often quite difficult for boxers to transfer between the gyms due to the matters on transfer fees, match fees and so on.

The JBC set up the Japanese heavyweight title once in 1957, but that division did not last long because there were few heavyweight boxers in Japan at that time. Therefore, they have recognized the titles and ratings only in thirteen weight divisions from minimumweight to middleweight for over fifty years. They added four weight divisions i.e. super middleweight, light heavyweight, cruiserweight and heavyweight, from September 2009. Kyōtarō Fujimoto was crowned the heavyweight champion in July 2013.

Tournaments

Currently Japan has two major annual tournaments. One is the  Tournament which came to be known by the popular anime/manga series Hajime no Ippo, and the other is the Japanese Title Elimination Tournament nicknamed  which is competed by "class A boxers" who have acquired a "class A license" to fight in eight or more round bouts, and whose winners would be recognized as the next mandatory challengers against each divisional Japanese champion in the annual mandatory bout series Champion Carnival. In addition to those, there are several other tournaments such as Raging Battle (renamed from B:Tight!).

Boxing today
As of Feb 2022, Japan produced 85 male world champions and 23 female world champions. When Yōta Satō won the world title to be the twelfth world champion managed by Kyoei Boxing Gym in March 2012, Japan had had nine world champions at the same time including an "emeritus champion" and a "champion in recess". Although nine boxers except non-Japanese nationals and females were crowned world champions across the sea, it is in contrast to the status of boxing in the Philippines where 31 of 40 world champions won the title abroad as of April 2016. Katsunari Takayama fighting out of the ALA Boxing Gym of Cebu City has won the IBF title in 2013, after resigning his JBC license in 2009 in order to compete for the IBF or the WBO title outside Japan.

Japan's male world champions rarely risk their titles outside of their country. Apart from non-Japanese nationals, the thirteen champions did it, and the only four among them successfully defended their titles. That is because Japan's professional boxing has given priority to holding the fights in their own country to get paid television broadcast rights fees. Consequently, Japan's champions still remain internationally unrecognized. The broadcast rights fees have decreased under the economic downturn.

Recognition Issues

Japanese boxers have very low recognition in the United States as cable networks are generally unconcerned with the lower weight classes to which most of the Japanese boxers belong. In April 2012, The Ring'''s Doug Fischer outlined the following three basic conditions that are required for Japan's boxing in order to earn international recognition:

The fight between the WBC's Kazuto Ioka and the WBA's Akira Yaegashi in June 2012 was the first-ever world title unification match for Japan's world champions. The president of Japan Pro Boxing Association Hideyuki Ohashi mentioned that it could be a healthy sign for the future of Japan's boxing. Prior to that, there have been two attempts to unify the world titles. However, in the fight between the WBA's Jirō Watanabe and the WBC's Payao Poontarat, Watanabe was stripped of his WBA title before the fight since he participated in that bout under the WBC rules without being sanctioned by the WBA. The chairman of the WBA's championship committee Elias Cordova had warned on the day of the fight stating that "The minute he steps into the ring Watanabe will be stripped of his title." In the fight between the WBC's Hozumi Hasegawa and the WBO's Fernando Montiel, Montiel's WBO title was not at stake because the JBC had recognized only the WBA, WBC and its co-founder OPBF as legitimate governing organizations sanctioning championship bouts and had not allowed their boxers to fight for the other organizations' titles.

WBO and IBF
On February 28, 2011, the JBC permitted them only when a Japan's reigning world titleholder of the WBA and/or WBC was going to fight in a title unification match against a world champion of the WBO and/or IBF. However, at that time, even if a Japan's champion won, he had to vacate the newer WBO and/or IBF title after a fixed period, and a defense match for the newer title was not authorized.

The JBC announced that they would join the WBO and the IBF on April 1, 2013. Although they still do not recognize the international title and regional titles, the JBC decided to allow their boxers to fight for any world titles of the four major sanctioning bodies.

Boxing fatalities

From 1950 through 2011, Tokyo was the city with the most boxing fatalities in the world. After the JBC's inception in April 1952, thirty-eight Japanese professional boxers died from fight injuries. In 1973, one boxer among them died after an eighth-round knockout loss in a super featherweight ten-round bout in Agana, Guam. He is the only Japanese who died outside of his home country.

There were six fatal accidents before that. First, an African American died of athlete's heart after an exhibition match in Yokohama in 1902. The first Japanese fatality was the former national lightweight champion, Nobuo Kobayashi. He never regained consciousness after a ninth-round technical knockout loss at the Koshien tennis court in Nishinomiya, Hyōgo in 1930.

After the year 1952, five Japanese amateur boxers and two Thai professional boxers died due to a fight in Japan. In addition, one Japanese amateur boxer died of cerebral hemorrhage after the test for a professional boxer's license, and one Japanese professional boxer suffered a fatal cerebral hemorrhage during a sparring session. The thirty-eighth victim under the JBC's professional regulations and rules, and the fifty-third in total, died of subdural hematoma seventeen days after his first professional bout against another debutant.

See also
List of Japanese boxing world championsAshita no Joe, Rokudenashi Blues and Hajime no Ippo'', popular manga titles about the sport

Notes

References

Bibliography

External links 

Official website of Japan Amateur Boxing Federation (JABF) 
Official website of Japan Boxing Commission (JBC) 
JBC rules West Japan Boxing Association 
Official website of Japan Pro Boxing Association (JPBA) 
Official website of East Japan Boxing Association 
Official website of West Japan Boxing Association